Nikolaos Argyriou (born 6 January 1969) is a Greek former professional footballer who played as a goalkeeper.

References

1969 births
Living people
Greek footballers
Kavala F.C. players
PAOK FC players
Iraklis Thessaloniki F.C. players
Association football goalkeepers
Super League Greece players